Radiation constant may refer to:

The first and second radiation constants c1 and c2 – see Planck's Law
The radiation density constant a – see Stefan–Boltzmann constant